Trichosirocalus is a genus of true weevils, native to the Old World, placed alternatively in the subfamily Ceutorhynchinae or in the tribe Ceutorhynchini of the subfamily Baridinae.

Partial species list 
 Trichosirocalus horridus Panzer, 1801
 Trichosirocalus troglodytes

References 

Ceutorhynchini
Baridinae genera
Beetles of Europe
Biological pest control beetles